Patricia Cantero Reina is a Spanish competitive sailor.

She competed at the 2021 470 World Championships in Vilamoura, winning a gold medal in the women's 470 class, along with Silvia Mas Depares.

References

Living people
Spanish female sailors (sport)
Sailors at the 2020 Summer Olympics – 470
1989 births